The Ursa Major Technologies Hadley is a  thrust Kerosene/LOX oxidizer-rich staged combustion cycle rocket engine.

Hadley is the first engine developed by Ursa Major Technologies. It started development in 2015, and prototypes were test fired in 2018. , qualification of the engine is complete and flight-ready engines have been delivered to customers.

Initial customers of the Hadley engine include Stratolaunch Systems, which has announced that they will use the Hadley engine on their Talon-A hypersonic test vehicle, and Phantom Space Corporation, who will use it on their Daytona small-lift rocket. ABL Space Systems initially announced they would use the Hadley engine for the upper-stage of their RS1 rocket, but have subsequently decided to use an internally-developed engine called E2.

References

External links 

 Ursa Major Technologies Hadley webpage

Rocket engines using kerosene propellant
Rocket engines using the staged combustion cycle